Boko is a town located in Assam, in the Kamrup district in the Indian state of Assam. The town is composed of 139 villages. It is approximately 55 kilometers west of Guwahati.

Culture 
Boko's cultural tradition is known mainly for the Bogai festival, which began in honor of a King Bogai who ruled the area. People visit Boko during this event, because it is the only one of its kind in the region and is the biggest festival held in the Dawkhin Kamrup area.

Boko is also home to the Xuwori festival, which has been celebrated in the town for almost a century. This festival is similar to Assam's Bihu, which is celebrated with great fervor and joy by all the indigenous Assamese communities irrespective of caste, creed, religion, faith or belief. The festival coincides with Rongali Bihu.

Transport 
Boko is accessible through National Highway 17 which connects it to nearby cities and towns. It has good communication infrastructure, which effectively connects it with the state of Meghalaya. It is an important jump-off location for people traveling to Hahim, Lampi, Chamaria, Malang and Nagarbera. The nearest railway station is in Belpara, 43 km from LGBI Airport. Boko is 60 km away from district headquarters in Amingaon.

Demographics 
The population of Boko constituency based on the 2011 census is 111,880. The average sex ratio of Boko is 983 women to 1000 men, or 56,415 males and 55,465 females. 23,509 families resided there. The total literacy rate is 76.17%. The male literacy rate is 70.85% and the female literacy rate is 61.9%. Based on population, Boko is ranked 8th in Kamrup district and ranked 122nd in Assam.

Places of interest 
Satras at Boko include Bhalukghata Satra, Haripur Satra and Chamaria Satra. Among them, Chamaria Satra is the oldest and largest. Sri Sri Bar Vishnu Than, Chamaria Satra located at Chamaria is known to be one of the oldest satras in Assam, while the Chamaria satra was established in 1588.This well-known satra is situated about 22 km from town.  A number of picnic areas are nearby, such as:

1). Hahim:-It is full of lush greenery. It has all the fine qualities required for it to be called an ideal picnic spot. But most people may not know that the spot which is considered to be an ideal picnic spot in the day time has an eerie dark side to it in the night time. The Hahim picnic spot is a natural and quiet place for people to go with friends and families and enjoy the silent stream.

2). Lampi:-a hamlet cradled in the hilly terrains of Assam bordering Meghalaya, a neighbouring state. Surrounded by hills where the humming of cascading streams fills the silence, Lampi is yet to witness the boons and banes of a modern life. So pollution, thankfully, is absent. But also absent are the basic amenities like health services, schools, electricity, good cooking fuel, sanitation and nutrition that deprive its residents of the rights which are constitutionally guaranteed to them. 
With a population of about eleven thousand, mostly Nepalis and Khasis, Lampi falls under the Boko subdivision of Kamrup district in Assam. Agriculture and livestock rearing continue to be the mainstay of its people.

3). Malangkona  Sildubi:-A waterfall near Malangkona village, Assam. The spot is not yet popular amongst tourists.

4). Batakuchi

5). Parvati temple :-
Parvati Hill is a hillock in Assam, India.

Education 
Boko is an important educational center. The town's schools and colleges include:
 Jawaharlal Nehru College
 Boko Junior college
 B.Ed. College
 Don Bosco higher secondary School
 Gracepresbyterian English School, Langkona
 Model English School, Borpara
 Vivekananda Vidyapith, Dakuapara
 Jatiya Vidyalaya
 Sankardev Sishu Niketan-Nabapur
 Sankardev Sishu Vidya Niketan-Dakuapara
 Naboday High School-Turukpara
 Boko High School
 Boko Girls High School
 Boko ME/MV School, Barpara

Politics 
The Bharatiya Janata Party and Indian National Congress are the major political parties in this area. Boko comes under the Boko (SC) constituency and Rabha Hasong Autonomous Council. Currently Nandita Das of the Congress is the Member of the Legislative Assembly.

Members of Legislative Assembly from Boko:

 1951: Radha Charan Choudhury, Socialist Party
 1957: Radha Charan Choudhury, Indian National Congress
 1962: Prabin Kumar Choudhury, Indian National Congress
 1967: Prabin Kumar Choudhury, Indian National Congress
 1972: Prabin Kumar Choudhury, Indian National Congress
 1978: Umesh Chandra Das, Janata Party
 1983: Upendra Das, Indian National Congress
 1985: Gopinath Das, Independent
 1991: Gopinath Das, Indian National Congress
 1996: Jyoti Prasad Das, Asom Gana Parishad
 2001: Gopinath Das, Indian National Congress
 2006: Jyoti Prasad Das, Asom Gana Parishad
 2011: Gopinath Das, All India United Democratic Front
 2016: Nandita Das, Indian National Congress
2021: Nandita Das ( Indian National Congress)

See also
 Chaygaon
 Palasbari

References

Cities and towns in Kamrup district